Genesis I is an experimental space habitat designed and built by the private American firm Bigelow Aerospace and launched in 2006. It was the first module to be sent into orbit by the company, and tested various systems, materials and techniques related to determining the viability of long-term inflatable space structures through 2008. Such structures, including this module and others built by Bigelow Aerospace, were similar to the 1990s NASA expandable TransHab design, which aimed to provide increased interior volume at a reduced launch diameter and potentially reduced mass compared to traditional rigid structures.

The on-board systems transmitted data for 2.5 years. The spacecraft remains in orbit, allowing researchers to continue to monitor the long-term viability of its expandable space structure.

Spacecraft history 
Genesis I was launched on 12 July 2006 at 14:53:36 UTC aboard an ISC Kosmotras Dnepr launch vehicle, launched from Dombarovsky missile base near Yasny, Orenburg Oblast, Russia. Spacecraft control was transferred to Bigelow Aerospace at 15:08 UTC after a successful orbital insertion. As part of the expandable design, however, the module launched with a diameter of only , inflating to its full size after entering orbit. The expansion process took approximately ten minutes.

Genesis I suffered a major radiation event in December 2006 as a result of a "solar storm". Mission controllers were able to restart the system in time, though the situation was described as being "one fault away from the spacecraft being dead". Despite this, no lasting damage occurred and the spacecraft was continuing to operate in "excellent shape" in March 2007.

The spacecraft completed its 10,000th orbit on 8 May 2008, some 660 days after launch. By that time, Genesis I had traveled more than 430 million kilometers (270 million miles), the equivalent of going to the Moon and back 1,154 times, and had taken more than 14,000 images, including images of all seven continents. Its electrical equipment had been continuously powered since it first became operational.

Although the design life of the spacecraft avionics was only six months, the avionics systems worked flawlessly for "over two and a half years" before failure. The data received after the first six months was a re-verification of the validation test suite that was accomplished during the design life period.

In February 2011, Bigelow reported that the vehicle had "performed flawlessly in terms of pressure maintenance and thermal control-environmental containment".

The orbital life was originally estimated to be 12 years, with a gradually decaying orbit resulting in re-entry into the atmosphere of Earth and burn-up expected. Its operations lasted approximately 2.5 years, significantly longer than its expected 6-month mission duration. , the spacecraft remains in orbit.

Systems 
Genesis I is outfitted with eight GaAs solar panel arrays, four on each end of the craft, which produced 1000 watts total power and maintained a 26 volt battery charge. It carries thirteen cameras, seven externally to monitor the physical condition of the spacecraft, such as the outer shell and solar arrays, and six internally to photograph the various objects and experiments. Genesis I used a single gas tank for its inflation system, and guidance/stabilization control is performed using a network of torque rods, sun sensors, GPS and a magnetometer.

Payload 
Aside from the various systems and monitoring equipment, Genesis I is orbiting with a wide variety of cargo. Bigelow employees contributed numerous photographs, toys, cards and other items, which were seen in still images floating around the cabin. Bigelow also placed a life sciences experiment on board, which contained four Madagascar hissing cockroaches (Gromphadorhina portentosa) and approximately 20 so-called Mexican jumping beans, which are seeds containing the live larva of the moth Cydia saltitans. In addition, the company allowed NASA to include a prototype for the GeneSat series of nanosatellites. This device, called GeneBox, tested the systems and procedures that will be used on future GeneSat missions. While GeneBox carries no living organisms, future flights will use sensors and optics to measure how weightlessness affects genes and the genetic activity of cells and microscopic life.

See also 

 Galaxy (spacecraft), a space habitat concept by Bigelow
 Genesis II
 Inflatable space habitat
 Sundancer, a space habitat concept by Bigelow

References

External links 
 Genesis spacecraft at Bigelow Aerospace
 

Bigelow Aerospace
Derelict satellites orbiting Earth
Space stations
Spacecraft launched in 2006
Spacecraft launched by Dnepr rockets